MF Vladimir Nazor is a ferry (named after Croatian poet and politician Vladimir Nazor) owned by Croatian shipping company Jadrolinija. It operates on local routes. It was built in Kraljevica Shipyard in 1986, for DINA Petrokemija Company to transport railway boxcars. After the project's collapse it was sold to Jadrolinija and refitted for passenger transport.

Yugoslav wars

In November 1992, the ship suffered damage during the Yugoslav Navy attack on the city of Split, in which two crew members were killed and several others were injured.

References

Passenger ships
Ferries of Croatia